Pierre Allais (c. 1700–1782) was a French painter and pastel artist.

External links
www.artnet.fr.

1700 births
1782 deaths
18th-century French painters
French male painters
18th-century French male artists
Pastel artists